Nikhil Chaudhary may refer to:

 Nikhil Kumar Choudhary (born 1948), Indian politician
 Nikhil Chaudhary (environmentalist), Indian  environmentalist, urban-planner and architect
 Nikhil Chaudhary (cricketer) (born 1996), Indian cricketer